Koriniti is a settlement  upriver from Whanganui, New Zealand, home to the Ngāti Pāmoana hapū of the iwi Te Āti Haunui-a-Pāpārangi.

The Māori settlement of Operiki was one of the larger on the Whanganui River, with a population of about 200. In 1848 the village was abandoned and a new one built in better agricultural land nearby at Otukopiri, renamed Koriniti by the missionary Richard Taylor, a Māori transliteration of Corinth.

Across the river from Koriniti, and reachable only by boat or cable car, is the Flying Fox lodge.

Marae

The local marae (Māori meeting place) is known as Koriniti Marae or Otukopiri Marae. It has three wharenui (meeting houses): Hikurangi Wharerata; the original whare Te Waiherehere, restored by Hõri Pukehika in 1921; and Poutama, moved across the river from Karatia (Galatia) in 1967.

Ōperika pā, the original home of Ngāti Pamoana, is nearby.

In the 19th century Māori at Koriniti raised £400 to build a flour mill, which was completed in 1854, the same year as the Kawana flour mill near Matahiwi.

In October 2020, the Government committed $287,183 from the Provincial Growth Fund to upgrade the marae, creating 19 jobs.

Notable people
 

Rangi Hauiti Pokiha (1895–1980), farmer, surveyor, and orator

References

Whanganui River
Populated places in Manawatū-Whanganui
Settlements on the Whanganui River